Smukler is a surname. Notable people with the surname include: 

Alexander Smukler, Russian businessman
David Smukler (1914–1971), American football player
Ken Smukler (born 1960), American politician